, also known as , is a mountain located in the Yoshiwa District of Hatsukaichi, Hiroshima Prefecture, Japan. "Kanmuri" is a common name for mountains in Japan; Hiroshima Prefecture has six mountains by this name alone, hence the modifier "Yoshiwa".

Description
The mountain is at the far west of the Chūgoku Mountains, and is part of Nishi-Chugoku Sanchi Quasi-National Park. The plateaus of the southern base of Mount Yoshiwa Kanmuri features large stands of renge tsutsuji rhododendron, and the area is designated a natural monument by the Prefecture of Hiroshima.

Recreation

 has facilities for camping and hiking, and is located in the fir forests at the eastern foot of the mountain.

Transportation

The Chugoku Expressway, also known as National Route 468, follows the southern base of Mount Yoshiwa Kanmuri.

External links
Mominoki Prefectural Forest

References

Mountains of Hiroshima Prefecture
Tourist attractions in Hiroshima Prefecture